Ivan Petrović (Cyrillic: Иван Петровић) may refer to:

 Ivan Petrović (footballer, born 1993)
 Ivan Petrović (footballer, born 1986)
 Ivan Petrović (footballer, born 1980)
 Ivan Petrović (footballer, born 1978)

or:

Iván Petrovich